Clifton Cawley (26 November 1906 – 1986) was a Jamaican cricketer. He played in one first-class match for the Jamaican cricket team in 1938/39.

See also
 List of Jamaican representative cricketers

References

External links
 

1906 births
1986 deaths
Jamaican cricketers
Jamaica cricketers
People from Saint Mary Parish, Jamaica